The Melbourne Prize (Architecture) is awarded by a jury appointed by the Victorian chapter of the Australian Institute of Architects to projects that have made a significant contribution to the civic life of Melbourne. It was first awarded in 1997 to Six Degrees Architects for the small bar Meyers Place.

2000 to 2009 Awards
The 2001 prize was won for the EQ Project at Hamer Hall by NMBW Architecture Studio, since demolished for the 2010 upgrade.

The Sidney Myer Music Bowl upgrade by Gregory Burgess Architects was awarded the prize in 2002.

Federation Square by Lab Architecture Studio with Bates Smart won the award along with four other awards in 2003. 

In 2004 it was awarded to Ashton Raggatt McDougall for Shrine of Remembrance Visitor Centre and Garden Courtyard. ARM again received the prize in 2006 for the Melbourne Central Shopping Centre redevelopment. 

The 2005 prize was awarded to NH Architecture for the QV mixed use retail redevelopment between Swanston and Russell Streets in the Melbourne CBD.

Six Degrees Architects also collected the award for a second time in 2008 with their redevelopment of The Vaults on the Yarra River beneath Federation Square for use as their own offices and the Riverland bar. The 2008 Jury was Peter Crone (chair), Alfred deBruyne and Mel Dodd.

Canada Hotel Redevelopment for student housing in Carlton, Melbourne by Hayball won the prize in 2009.

2010 to 2019 Awards
The Melbourne Convention and Exhibition Centre by joint venture architects, Woods Bagot and NH Architecture was awarded the 2010 Melbourne Prize in addition to the Victorian Architecture Medal, William Wardell Award for Public Architecture, Steel Architecture Award and the Award for Sustainable Architecture. 

The 2011 prize was won by Cox Architects for AAMI Park, Melbourne's major rectangular stadium. 

The Royal Children’s Hospital by Billard Leece Partnership and Bates Smart was awarded the prize in 2012. 

In 2013 the prize was awarded to BKK Architects for their Lonsdale Street Redesign. 

In addition to the William Wardell Award for Public Architecture, the Dallas Brooks Community Primary School by McBride Charles Ryan won the 2014 Melbourne Prize.

ARM Architecture won a third Melbourne Prize and a second Melbourne Prize for the same project for additional work at the Shrine of Remembrance, Galleries of Remembrance, with Rush\Wright in 2015. 

In 2016 the prize was awarded to the Saltwater Community Centre by Croxon Ramsay Architects. The Jury for 2016 was Tim Jackson (chair, Jackson Clements Burrows Architects), Peter Williams (Williams Boag), Anna Maskiell (Public Realm Lab).

In 2017 it was awarded jointly to the NGV architecture commission: Haven’t you always wanted…? by M@ STUDIO Architects and the Tanderrum Bridge by John Wardle Architects and NADAAA in collaboration. The 2017 jury was made up of James Staughton (Workshop Architecture),  Alison Nunn (Alison Nunn Architect), Amy Muir (Muir Architects).

Shortlisted nominees for the 2018 prize were; McAuley Community Services for Women by Hede Architects, the North Fitzroy Library and Community Hub by Group GSA, New Academic Street, RMIT University – Lyons with NMBW Architecture Studio, Harrison and White, MvS Architects and Maddison Architects (Joint Winner), and Nightingale 1 apartments by Breathe Architecture (Joint Winner). The 2018 Melbourne Prize jury was Shelley Penn (Shelley Penn Architect, chair), Simon Knott (BKK Architects), Tania Davidge (Openhaus).

Shortlisted nominees for the 2019 prize were: Caulfield to Dandenong Level Crossing Removal — Cox Architecture with Aspect Studios, Parliament of Victoria Members’ Annexe – Peter Elliott Architecture and Urban Design
Private Women’s Club – Kerstin Thompson Architects, South Melbourne Primary School – Hayball, and The Club Stand – Bates Smart. The 2019 Melbourne Prize jury was Jane Williams (John Wardle Architects, chair), Alix Smith (Hassell), and Stefano Scalzo (Victorian Health and Human Services Building Authority).

2020 to 2029 Awards
The 2020 Melbourne Prize jury of three was chaired by Reno Rizzo (Inarc Architects) with Madeline Sewall (Breathe Architecture) and Minnie Cade (John Wardle Architects). The State Library Victoria Redevelopment by Architectus and Schmidt Hammer Lassen Architects was awarded the 2020 award in July. The 2020 project shortlist considered for the award included the Carlton Learning Precinct COLA by Law Architects, Monash University Ian Potter Centre for Performing Arts by Peter Elliott Architecture and Urban Design and State Library Victoria Redevelopment by Architectus and Schmidt Hammer Lassen Architects. 

The 2021 jury of three was chaired by Andrew Maynard (Austin Maynard Architects) with Sarah Bryant (Bryant Alsop Architects) and Sarah Zahradnik (NH Architecture). The 2021 prize was awarded to the Monash Woodside Building for Technology and Design by Grimshaw Architects in collaboration with Monash University and was the most awarded project of the year — also winning the Victorian Architecture Medal, COLORBOND® Award for Steel Architecture and an award for Sustainability and Educational Architecture categories. The 2021 shortlist considered for the award included the ACMI Renewal by BKK Architects and Razorfish, Carrum Station and Foreshore Precinct by Cox Architecture, Collins Arch by Woods Bagot and SHoP Architects, Docklands Primary School by Cox Architecture, Jackalope Pavilion by March Studio, Monash Woodside Building for Technology and Design by Grimshaw in collaboration with Monash University, Olderfleet also by Grimshaw, Prahran Square by Lyons and Springvale Community Hub also by Lyons.

Recipients by year

References

Architecture awards